The Cowes Maritime Museum is a local maritime museum in Cowes, Isle of Wight, southern England.

The museum is co-located within Cowes Library. It was started by library staff in the 1970s. It has a small exhibition area that displays model boats from its collection. The museum also has a photographic and paper archive covering yachting and the shipbuilding industry at Cowes. The museum is in Beckford Road in central Cowes and is free of charge.

See also 
 List of museums on the Isle of Wight

References

External links 
 Cowes Maritime Museum website - Isle of Wight Council

Museums on the Isle of Wight
Maritime museums in England
Local museums on the Isle of Wight
Cowes